Krasnogvardeysky District is a district of the federal city of St. Petersburg, Russia. As of the 2010 Census, its population was 337,091; up from 336,342 recorded in the 2002 Census. The population as of the 1989 Census was 377,765.

Municipal divisions
Krasnogvardeysky District comprises the following five municipal okrugs:
Bolshaya Okhta
Malaya Okhta
Polyustrovo
Porokhovye
Rzhevka

References

Notes

Sources

